Walter FitzWalter, 3rd Baron FitzWalter (31 May 1345 – 26 September 1386) was an English soldier and nobleman.

Biography
Walter was the son of John FitzWalter, 2nd Baron FitzWalter and Eleanor Percy, the second daughter of Henry Percy, 2nd Baron Percy. His father died in 1361, when Walter was identified as being 16 years old. In October 1366 he came of age and received his inheritance.

Fitzwalter accompanied Sir Robert Knolles in leading a force of English troops in northwest France, where he was soon forced to seek refuge within the walls of Vaas Abbey. However, Fitzwalter was attacked by Louis de Sancerre and a large French army. He was taken prisoner. The ransom forced Walter to mortgage his castle and Lordship of Egremont to Alice Perrers, the king's mistress.

He served in John of Gaunt, Duke of Lancaster's Spanish campaign of 1386, where he died at sea.

Marriage and issue
He married firstly Eleanor, daughter of Thomas Dagworth and Eleanor de Bohun, Countess of Ormonde, and they are known to have had the following issue.
Robert Fitzwalter, his eldest son, predeceased his father and died childless.
Walter Fitzwalter, 4th Baron Fitzwalter, his second son, married Joan Devereux, had issue.
His second marriage was to Philippa, daughter of John de Mohun and Joan Burghersh. This marriage did not provide any issue.

References
Cokayne, George Edward.  The Complete Peerage of England, Scotland, Ireland, Great Britain, and the United Kingdom. 1st ed. v3. pp. 369–374.

1345 births
1386 deaths
14th-century English nobility
Barons FitzWalter
English soldiers
14th-century military history of the Kingdom of England
Place of birth missing
Military personnel from Essex
People who died at sea